Mesophleps coffeae is a moth of the family Gelechiidae. It is found in China (Hong Kong), Thailand, Malaysia, Indonesia (North Sulawesi) and Timor.

The wingspan is 8–16.5 mm. The forewings are whitish yellow to greyish brown, with a distinct discocellular spot.

The larvae feed on Coffea species, including Coffea liberica and possibly Coffea quillou. They live in the dry berries.

Etymology
The species name is derived from the host-plant genus Coffea.

References

Moths described in 2012
Mesophleps